Shamsher Singh (born 28 December 1983) is an Indian cricketer. He made his List A debut for Rajasthan in the 2005–06 Ranji Trophy on 10 February 2006. He made his first-class debut on 7 November 2003, for Rajasthan in the 2003–04 Ranji Trophy.

References

External links 
Shamsher Singh at ESPNcricinfo
Shamsher Singh at CricketArchive (subscription required)

1983 births
Living people
Indian cricketers